An heir apparent, often shortened to heir, is a person who is first in an order of succession and cannot be displaced from inheriting by the birth of another person; a person who is first in the order of succession but can be displaced by the birth of a more eligible heir is known as heir presumptive.

Today these terms most commonly describe heirs to hereditary titles (e.g. titles of nobility) or offices, especially when only inheritable by a single person. Most monarchies refer to the heir apparent of their thrones with the descriptive term of crown prince or crown princess, but they may also be accorded with a more specific substantive title: such as Prince of Orange in the Netherlands, Duke of Brabant in Belgium, Prince of Asturias in Spain (also granted to heirs presumptive), or the Prince of Wales in the United Kingdom; former titles include Dauphin in the Kingdom of France, and Tsesarevich in Imperial Russia.

The term is also used metaphorically to indicate an expected successor to any position of power, e.g. a political or corporate leader.

Heir apparent versus heir presumptive 

In a hereditary system governed by some form of primogeniture, an heir apparent is easily identifiable as the person whose position as first in the line of succession to a title or office is secure, regardless of future births. An heir presumptive, by contrast, can always be "bumped down" in the succession by the birth of somebody more closely related in a legal sense (according to that form of primogeniture) to the current title-holder.

The clearest example occurs in the case of a childless bearer of a hereditary title that can only be inherited by one person. If at any time the title bearer were to produce children, those children would rank ahead of any person who had formerly been heir presumptive.

Many legal systems assume childbirth is always possible regardless of age or health. In such circumstances a person may be, in a practical sense, the heir apparent but still, legally speaking, heir presumptive. Indeed, when Queen Victoria succeeded her uncle King William IV, the wording of the proclamation even gave as a caveat:

This provided for the possibility that William's wife, Adelaide of Saxe-Meiningen, was pregnant at the moment of his death, since such a posthumous child, regardless of its sex, would have displaced Victoria from the throne.  Adelaide was 44 at the time, so pregnancy was possible even if unlikely.

Daughters in male-preference primogeniture 
Daughters (and their lines) may inherit titles that descend according to male-preference primogeniture, but only in default of sons (and their heirs).  That is, both female and male offspring have the right to a place somewhere in the order of succession, but when it comes to what that place is, a female will rank behind her brothers regardless of their ages or her age.

Thus, normally, even an only daughter will not be heir apparent, since at any time a brother might be born who, though younger, would assume that position. Hence, she is an heir presumptive. For example, Queen Elizabeth II was heir presumptive during the reign of her father, King George VI, because at any stage up to nine to ten months after his death, George could have fathered a legitimate son.

However, a granddaughter could for example be heir apparent if she were the only daughter of the deceased eldest son of the sovereign (e.g. Queen Elizabeth II would have been heir apparent to George V if her oldest uncle and father both had died before their father).

Women as heirs apparent 
In a system of absolute primogeniture that disregards gender, female heirs apparent occur. As succession to titles, positions, or offices in the past most often favoured males, females considered to be an heir apparent were rare. Absolute primogeniture was not practised by any modern monarchy for succession to their thrones until the late twentieth century, with Sweden being the first to adopt absolute primogeniture in 1980 and other Western European monarchies following suit.

Since the adoption of absolute primogeniture by contemporary Western European monarchies, examples of female heirs apparent include Crown Princess Victoria of Sweden, Princess Catharina-Amalia of the Netherlands, and Princess Elisabeth of Belgium; they are, respectively, the oldest children of Kings Carl XVI Gustaf, Willem-Alexander, and Philippe. Princess Ingrid Alexandra of Norway is heir apparent to her father, who is heir apparent to the Norwegian throne, and Victoria herself has a female heir apparent in her oldest child, Princess Estelle. Victoria was not heir apparent from birth (in 1977), but gained the status in 1980 following a change in the Swedish Act of Succession. Her younger brother Carl Philip (born 1979) was thus heir apparent for a few months (and is a rare example of an heir apparent losing this status without a death occurring).

In 2015, pursuant to the 2011 Perth Agreement, the Commonwealth realms changed the rules of succession to the 16 thrones of Elizabeth II to absolute primogeniture, except for male heirs born before the Perth Agreement. The effects are not likely to be felt for many years; the first two heirs at the time of the agreement (Charles, Prince of Wales, later Charles III, and his son William, Prince of Wales) were already eldest born children, and in 2013 William's first-born son Prince George of Wales became the next apparent successor.

In one special case, however, England and Scotland had a female heir apparent. The Revolution settlement that established William and Mary as joint monarchs in 1689 only gave the power to continue the succession through issue to Mary II, elder daughter of the previous king, James II.  William, by contrast, was to reign for life only, and his (hypothetical) children by a wife other than Mary would be placed in his original place (as Mary's first cousin) in the line of succession—after Mary's younger sister Anne.  Thus, although after Mary's death William continued to reign, he had no power to beget direct heirs, and Anne became the heir apparent for the remainder of William's reign. She eventually succeeded him as Queen of England, Scotland and Ireland.

Displacement of heirs apparent 
The position of an heir apparent is normally unshakable: it can be assumed they will inherit. Sometimes, however, extraordinary events—such as the death or the deposition of the parent—intervene.

People who lost heir apparent status 
 Al-Mufawwid on 30 April 892, al-Muwaffad was removed from the succession (heir apparent) completely, and when al-Mu'tamid died in October 892, he was succeeded by Al-Mu'tadid.
 Parliament deposed James Francis Edward Stuart, the infant son of King James II & VII (of England and Scotland respectively) whom James II was raising as a Catholic, as the King's legal heir apparent—declaring that James had, de facto, abdicated—and offered the throne to James II's elder daughter, the young prince's much older Protestant half-sister, Mary (along with her husband, Prince William of Orange).  When the exiled King James died in 1701, his Jacobite supporters proclaimed the exiled Prince James Francis Edward as King James III of England and James VIII of Scotland; but neither he nor his descendants were ever successful in their bids for the throne.
 Crown Prince Gustav (later known as Gustav, Prince of Vasa), son of Gustav IV Adolf of Sweden, lost his place when his father was deposed and replaced by Gustav IV Adolf's aged uncle, the Duke Carl, who became Charles XIII of Sweden in 1809.  The aged King Charles XIII did not have surviving sons, and Prince Gustav was the only living male of the whole dynasty (besides his deposed father), but the prince was never regarded as heir of Charles XIII, although there were factions in the Riksdag and elsewhere in Sweden who desired to preserve him, and, in the subsequent constitutional elections, supported his election as his grand-uncle's successor.  Instead, the government proceeded to have a new crown prince elected (which was the proper constitutional action, if no male heir was left in the dynasty), and the Riksdag elected first August, Prince of Augustenborg, and then, after August's death, the Prince of Ponte Corvo (Marshal Jean-Baptiste Bernadotte, who acceded as Charles XIV John in 1818). The two lines united later, when Charles XIV John's great-grandson Crown Prince Gustaf (who acceded as Gustaf V in 1907) married Gustav IV Adolf's great-granddaughter Victoria of Baden, who became Crown Princess of Sweden. Thus, from Gustav VI Adolf onwards, the kings of Sweden are direct descendants of both Gustav IV Adolf and his son's replacement as crown prince, Charles XIV John.
 Prince Carl Philip of Sweden, at his birth in 1979, was heir apparent to the throne of Sweden.  Less than eight months later, a change in that country's succession laws instituted absolute primogeniture, and Carl Philip was supplanted as heir apparent by his elder sister Victoria.
 Muqrin bin Abdulaziz became Crown Prince of Saudi Arabia in January 2015 upon the death of his half-brother King Abdullah bin Abdulaziz Al Saud and the accession of another half-brother, Salman bin Abdulaziz Al Saud, to the Saudi throne. In April of that year, Salman removed Muqrin as Crown Prince, replacing him with their nephew Muhammad bin Nayef. Muhammad bin Nayef himself was later replaced as Crown Prince by the king's son Mohammad bin Salman.

Breaching legal qualification of heirs apparent 
In some jurisdictions, an heir apparent can automatically lose that status by breaching certain constitutional rules. Today, for example:

 A British heir apparent would lose this status if he or she became a Catholic. This is the only religion-based restriction on the heir-apparent. (Previously, marrying a Catholic also equated to losing this status, however, in October 2011, the governments of the then-16 Commonwealth realms—now 15, of which King Charles III is monarch—agreed to remove the restriction on marriage to a Catholic. All of the Commonwealth realms subsequently passed legislation to implement the change, which fully took effect in March 2015.)
 Swedish Crown Princes and Crown Princesses would lose heir apparent status, according to the Act of Succession, if they married without approval of the monarch and the Government, abandoned the "pure Evangelical faith", or accepted another throne without the approval of the Riksdag.
 Dutch Princes and Princesses of Orange would lose status as heir to the throne if they married without the approval of the States-General, or simply renounced the right.
 Spanish Princes and Princesses of Asturias would lose status if they married against the express prohibition of the monarch and the Cortes.
 Belgian Dukes and Duchesses of Brabant would lose heir apparent status if they married without the consent of the monarch, or became monarch of another country.
 Danish Crown Princes and Princesses would lose status if they married without the permission of the monarch. When the monarch grants permission for a dynast to enter marriage, he may set conditions that must be met for the dynasts and/or their children to gain or maintain a place in the line of succession; this also applies for Crown Princes and Princesses.

Current heirs apparent

Heirs apparent who never inherited the throne

Heirs apparent who predeceased the monarch

Heirs apparent who were forced to abandon their claim

Heirs apparent of monarchs who themselves abdicated or were deposed

See also
List of heirs apparent
President-elect
Prime minister-designate
Heads of former ruling families

Notes and references

Notes

References 

Monarchy
Inheritance